Beauty Point is an urban locality in the suburb of Mosman in Sydney, New South Wales, Australia. It is located in the local government area of the Municipality of Mosman and is part of the Lower North Shore.

History
Beauty Point takes its name from the piece of land protruding into the Middle Harbour, off Sydney Harbour. It was originally known as Billy Goat Point, but was renamed when it was subdivided to be sold.

Schools
 Beauty Point Public School

Churches
 St Thérèse of the Child Jesus Catholic Church

References

Sydney localities
Mosman Council